Thought Balloon Mushroom Cloud is the second studio album by American hip hop musician MC Paul Barman. It was released in 2009.

Track listing

References

Further reading

External links
 

2009 albums
MC Paul Barman albums
Albums produced by MF Doom
Albums produced by James Poyser
Albums produced by Prince Paul (producer)
Albums produced by Questlove